Paparazzi is a 1998 French comedy film, directed by Alain Berbérian.

Plot
Franck Bordoni (Patrick Timsit) loses job as a night watchman when he finds himself inadvertently on the front cover of a popular magazine. The photograph was taken while he was enjoying a football match instead of working. Deciding to punish the photographer, Franck visits the magazine's offices and finds Michel Verdier (Vincent Lindon), a member of the paparazzi pack. Franck immerses himself in exciting new life (and Isabelle Adjani’s dustbins), however he hardly notices former life (including wife and son) disappear.

Cast
Vincent Lindon : Michel Verdier
Patrick Timsit : Franck Bordoni
Catherine Frot : Evelyne Bordoni
Nathalie Baye : Nicole
Isabelle Gélinas : Sandra
Élise Tielrooy : Bénédicte
Didier Bénureau : Dacharie
Géraldine Bonnet-Guérin : Julie
Tim Doughty : M.C. Watson
Christophe Hémon : Xavier
Jean-Noël Cridlig-Veneziano : Nicolas
Christophe Guybet : Médi
Stefan Elbaum : Foreman
Dominique Besnehard : Dédé
Hichem Rostom : Kabouli
Jean-Marie Winling : Franck's boss
Françoise Lépine : The press officer

References

External links

1998 films
1998 comedy films
Films directed by Alain Berbérian
French comedy films
1990s French films